Bahmanabad-e Jadid (also Romanized as Bahmanābād-e Jadīd; also known as Bahmanābād) is a village in Shaskuh Rural District, Central District, Zirkuh County, South Khorasan Province, Iran. At the 2006 census, its population was 1,226, in 269 families.

References 

Populated places in Zirkuh County